Liaoxitriton is an extinct genus of prehistoric cryptobranchoid salamanders from the Early Cretaceous of China. It contains one species, L. zhongjiani, from the Aptian aged Yixian Formation. A second species, L. daohugouensis from the Middle/Late Jurassic Daohugou Beds, was moved to the genus Neimengtriton in 2021 after a number of studies noted morphological differences between the two genera.

See also
 Prehistoric amphibian
 List of prehistoric amphibians

References

Cretaceous amphibians of Asia
Early Cretaceous amphibians
Cretaceous salamanders
Prehistoric amphibian genera
Early Cretaceous genus extinctions
Cryptobranchoidea